The Adventurer's (衝擊) is a TVB television series, premiered in 1980. Its theme song "The Adventurer's" (衝擊) and the sub theme song "The Sentimental Debts" (情債) had both composition and arrangement by Joseph Koo, while the lyricist was Wong Jim.

Cast 
 Deborah Lee
 Simon Yam
 Angie Chiu
 Kent Tong
 Michael Miu
 KK Cheung

References

1980 Hong Kong television series debuts
1981 Hong Kong television series endings
TVB dramas
Cantonese-language television shows